Jesús Isaac Hernández Córdova (born 6 January 1993) is a Venezuelan footballer who currently plays for Envigado as a striker.

Career

Youth, college and amateur
Hernández was born in Cumaná, Sucre, and began his career in the 2015  education tournament with ACD Lara until Torneo Clausura 2017, he accumulated 5365 minutes, in 73 games with 26 goals. He plays with Deportivo Anzoátegui, Llaneros de Guanare y Aragua FC.

References

1993 births
Living people
Venezuelan footballers
Venezuelan expatriate footballers
Association football forwards
Deportivo Anzoátegui players
Aragua FC players
Monagas S.C. players
Asociación Civil Deportivo Lara players
C.F. Os Belenenses players
Deportes Iquique footballers
Audax Italiano footballers
Primeira Liga players
Chilean Primera División players
Venezuelan Primera División players
Venezuelan expatriate sportspeople in Chile
Venezuelan expatriate sportspeople in Portugal
Expatriate footballers in Chile
Expatriate footballers in Portugal
People from Cumaná
21st-century Venezuelan people